Landvoigt is a German surname that may refer to
Arnold Landvoigt (1879–1970), German rugby union player
Bernd Landvoigt (born 1951), German rower
Jörg Landvoigt (born 1951), German rower, twin brother of Bernd 
Ike Landvoigt (born 1973), German rower, son of Jörg

German-language surnames